Daniel S. Laikin is an American business executive. He served as chief operating officer and chief executive officer of National Lampoon, Incorporated from 2002 to 2008.

Life and career

Laikin served as co-chairman of Indiana-based real estate development company Biltmore Homes, Inc., until 2000. He also served as a managing partner of technology investment firm Four Leaf Partners, LLC.

In 2001, Laikin's group moved to buy a majority stake in J2 Communications Inc., the owner of the moribund National Lampoon properties.  From 2002 forward they built media businesses around the brand, becoming active in film, television, radio, print, as well as building the largest Internet based comedy network in the world. 

Laikin was the largest shareholder of National Lampoon, Incorporated. In December 2008, the SEC alleged Laikin conspired to inflate the company's stock price.  In 2010, a federal judge sentenced Laikin to 45 months in prison. He was released in 2012. Laikin was replaced by Tim Durham, who himself was arrested in 2011 for looting more than $200 million from the company.

References

Living people
1962 births
American chief operating officers
American chief executives in the media industry